Vasily Gherghy (born 3 January 1974) is a Moldovan biathlete. He competed in the men's 20 km individual event at the 1994 Winter Olympics.

References

1974 births
Living people
Moldovan male biathletes
Olympic biathletes of Moldova
Biathletes at the 1994 Winter Olympics
People from Izmail